The 2015 Vale of White Horse District Council election took place on 7 May 2015 to elect members of Vale of White Horse District Council in England. This was held on the same day as other local elections. In 2015, the council seats were contested against redrawn ward boundaries. The whole council was up for election and the Conservatives retained control, with an increased majority of seats.

Election results

Composition of the council following the 2015 election:

Conservative 29
Liberal Democrat 9

Ward Results

References

2015 English local elections
May 2015 events in the United Kingdom
2015
2010s in Oxfordshire